Dover–Calais ferry may refer to any of several ferry routes across the English Channel between Dover and Calais:

Current operators

 Dover–Calais ferry (DFDS Seaways), a Danish shipping company 
 Dover–Calais ferry (P&O Ferries), a British shipping company that operates ferries
 Dover-Calais ferry (Irish Ferries), an Irish shipping company which began its service in April 2021

Former operators

 Dover–Calais ferry (Hoverspeed), a British shipping company that operated hovercraft and catamarans
 Dover–Calais ferry (Seaspeed), hovercraft services operated by British Rail in conjunction with French railway operator SNCF
 Dover–Calais ferry (MyFerryLink), a French passenger and freight ferry company

See also
 Dover–Calais, 1986 song performed by Style
 English channel#Ferry, a list of cross-channel ferry routes